Bennett House may refer to:

in the United States
(by state then city)
Nathan Bennett House, Madison, Georgia, listed on the National Register of Historic Places (NRHP) in Morgan County
Jamieson-Bennett House, Indianapolis, Indiana, NRHP-listed in Marion County
Edward H. Bennett House and Studio, Lake Forest, Illinois, NRHP-listed in Lake County
Bennett Plantation House, Alexandria, Louisiana, NRHP-listed in Rapides Parish
Brame-Bennett House, Clinton, Louisiana, listed on the NRHP-listed in East Feliciana Parish
Nathaniel and Elizabeth Bennett House, Norway, Maine, NRHP-listed in Oxford County 
Bennett-Kelly Farm, Sykesville, Maryland
Lord-Baylies-Bennett House, Taunton, Massachusetts
Bennett-Shattuck House, Groton, Massachusetts
Henry Bennett House, Ann Arbor, Michigan, NRHP-listed in Washtenaw County
Bennett–McBride House, Minneapolis, Minnesota, NRHP-listed in Hennepin County
Bennett-Tobler-Pace-Oliver House, Jackson, Missouri, NRHP-listed
John W. Bennett House, Brownville, Nebraska, NRHP-listed in Nemaha County
Bennett Family House, Monticello, New York, NRHP-listed
Wyckoff-Bennett Homestead, New York, New York
Lane-Bennett House, Raleigh, North Carolina, NRHP-listed
George Bennett House, Harrison, Ohio, NRHP-listed
Bennett–Williams House, The Dalles, Oregon, NRHP-listed
Whipple-Angell-Bennett House, North Providence, Rhode Island
Gov. Thomas Bennett House, Charleston, South Carolina
Bennett House (Franklin, Tennessee)
Mosby-Bennett House, Memphis, Tennessee, NRHP-listed in Shelby County
M. D. Bennett House, Cuero, Texas, listed on the NRHP-listed in DeWitt County
Neighbor-Bennett House, Fall City, Washington, NRHP-listed in King County
Jonathan M. Bennett House, Weston, West Virginia, NRHP-listed
H. H. Bennett Studio, Wisconsin Dells, Wisconsin, NRHP-listed

See also
Bennett Building (disambiguation)